Blendwerk Antikunst is the fourth album of Stillste Stund. This album was also available in digipack format with a bonus disc.

Track listing
"Untertage"– 5:46
"Apocalyptic Noon"– 5:53
"Alice II (nie allein mit Dir)"– 5:42
"Kein Mittel gegen dieses Gift"– 5:05
"Darksomely"– 5:49
"Ananke"– 6:49
"Die Teufelsbuhle"– 7:00
"Secludia X"– 6:12
"Obsessed with Purple"– 5:32
"Geistunter (Psychoclonehardcorechrist)"– 4:33
"Blendwerk Antikunst"– 7:22
"Lass uns der Regen sein"– 7:36

Bonus disc: Endwerk EP
"Endwerk"– 23:02
"Endwerk (Short Shylock Version)"– 5:24

Info
 Music & lyrics, instruments, audio sculpturing & production by Oliver Uckermann
 Male vocals by Oliver Uckermann
 Female vocals  by Birgit Strunz
 Lyrics & vocal-parts tracks 2, 6, 9 by Birgit Strunz
 Album artwork by Birgit Strunz
 Booklet images track 7 "Die Teufelsbuhle" by courtesy of the Kriminalmuseum Rothenburg

References
 Blendwerk Antikunst at Musicbrainz.org
 Endwerk EP at Musicbrainz.org
 Discography at official website
 Stillste Stund Discography Info

2005 albums
Alice In... albums
Stillste Stund albums